Alamgir Hashmi (Urdu: عالمگیر ہاشمی), also known as Aurangzeb Alamgir Hashmi (born 15 November 1951), is an English poet of Pakistani origin. Considered avant-garde, his early and later works were published to considerable critical acclaim and popularity.

Alamgir Hashmi is said to have been born in this part of Planet Earth and trained, persuasively, formally and informally, to stay on here. His serious learning began as a child, at the home of his parents, who taught him many fine things of life including reading, writing, and listening, so that he would begin to hear the music of the spheres from early on. Later he chose his company, schools, and places to be according to his abiding interests, and went on to write mainly in different forms of poetry and prose, and to teach (subjects like language, literature, culture, interdisciplinary studies, and theory). Perhaps better known as an English poet, he has been a professor of English and comparative literature, an editor of literary and scholarly journals, a scholar-critic, a broadcaster, a translator, long lapsed lay minstrel, and a weekend canoeist. His work spans nearly all continents, for over four decades now, and he lives wherever his work lives. He acknowledges life as a gift.

He was a practicing transnational humanist and educator in North American, European and Asian universities. He argued for a "comparative" aesthetic to foster humane cultural norms. He showed and advocated new paths of reading the classical and modern texts and emphasized the sublime nature, position and pleasures of language arts to be shared, rejecting their reduction to social or professional utilities.  He produced many books of seminal literary and critical importance as well as series of lectures and essays (such as "Modern Letters") in the general press.

Education 

 Education: University of the Punjab, Lahore, M.A. 1972; 
 University of Louisville, Kentucky, M.A. 1977

Poetry 

 The Oath and Amen. Philadelphia, Dorrance, 1976.
 America Is a Punjabi Word. Lahore, Karakorum Range, 1979.
 An Old Chair. Bristol, Xenia Press, 1979.
 My Second in Kentucky. Lahore, Vision Press, 1981.
 This Time in Lahore. Lahore, Vision Press, 1983.
 Neither This Time/Nor That Place. Lahore, Vision Press, 1984.
 Inland and Other Poems. Islamabad, Gulmohar Press, 1984.
 The Poems of Alamgir Hashmi. Islamabad, National Book Foundation, 1992.
 Sun and Moon and Other Poems. Islamabad, Indus Books, 1992.
 A Choice of Hashmi's Verse. Karachi and New York, Oxford University Press, 1997.
All the poems are best and worth reading.

Literary Criticism and Scholarly Editions 

 Pakistani Short Stories in English
 Postindependence Voices in South Asian Writings
 The Commonwealth, Comparative Literature and the World
 The Worlds of Muslim Imagination
 Ezra Pound
 Commonwealth Literature: An Essay Towards the Re-definition of a Popular / Counter Culture
 Pakistani Literature: The Contemporary English Writers

Others 

 Commonwealth Literature: An Essay Towards the Re-Definition of a Popular/Counter Culture. Lahore, Vision Press, 1983
 The Commonwealth, Comparative Literature and the World. Islamabad, Gulmohar Press, 1988
 Editor, Pakistani Literature: The Contemporary English Writers. New York, World University Service, 2 vols., 1978; revised edition, Islamabad, Gulmohar Press, I vol., 1987
 Editor, with Les Harrop and others, Ezra Pound in Melbourne. Ivanhoe, Australia, Helix, 1983
 Editor, The Worlds of Muslim Imagination. Islamabad, Gulmohar Press, 1986
 Editor, Encyclopedia of Post-Colonial Literatures in English. London, Routledge, 1994

Awards 

 The University of the Punjab (Lahore) Scholar, 1970–72, and Certificate of Academic Merit, 1973; first prize
 All-Pakistan Creative Writing Contest, 1972
 Pakistan Academy of Letters Patras Bokhari award, 1985
 Rockefeller Fellow, 1994
 Roberto Celli Memorial award (Italy), 1994
 D.Litt.: University of Luxembourg, 1984
 San Francisco State University, 1984

References

See also

List of Pakistani writers

1951 births
Living people
British writers
Pakistani male poets
English-language poets from Pakistan
Pakistani literary critics
English literary critics
American academics
American male poets
Pakistani writers
Place of birth missing (living people)